Jozias Johannes van Aartsen (. born 25 December 1947) is a retired Dutch politician who served as Leader of the People's Party for Freedom and Democracy from 2004 to 2006.

A native of The Hague, he attended the Christelijk Gymnasium Sorghvliet from April 1960 until May 1968 and applied at the Vrije Universiteit Amsterdam in June 1968 majoring in Law and obtaining a Bachelor of Laws degree in July 1970. Van Aartsen served as Minister of Agriculture, Nature and Fisheries (1994–1998) and Minister of Foreign Affairs (1998–2002) under Prime Minister Wim Kok, as well as Mayor of The Hague from 2008 until 2017.

Early life
Jozias Johannes van Aartsen was born on 25 December 1947 in The Hague, son of Jan van Aartsen, a politician of the Anti Revolutionary Party (ARP). He served as Minister of Transport and Water Management, Minister of Housing and Construction and Queen's Commissioner of Zeeland. After completing the Gymnasium-a he studied law at the Vrije Universiteit Amsterdam. At the age of 22 van Aartsen moved to The Hague to work in politics.

Politics

When Hans Wiegel became party leader, in 1971, Van Aartsen was asked to work for Wiegel as employee of the party in the House of Representatives. In 1974 he became director-general of the Telders Foundation, the scientific institute of the People's Party for Freedom and Democracy. Van Aartsen worked as a political consultant for the People's Party for Freedom and Democracy from July 1970 until August 1974 and as the director of the Telders Foundation think tank from August 1974 until February 1979. Van Aartsen worked as a civil servant for the Ministry of the Interior from February 1979 until August 1994 as Deputy Director-General of the department for Administrative Affairs from February 1979 until April 1981 and as Director-General of the department for Administrative Affairs from April 1981 until July 1983 and as Deputy Secretary-General of the Ministry of the Interior from July 1983 until January 1985 and as Secretary-General of the Ministry of the Interior from January 1985 until August 1994.

In 1978 Van Aartsen became Chef de Bureau of the Secretary General of Interior. He did this under Ministers Rietkerk, Van Dijk, De Korte, De Koning, Dales and De Graaf. In 1985 he became Secretary General of Interior himself. After the election of 1994 he was made the Minister of Agriculture from 1994 to 1998 in the First Kok cabinet. After the election of 1998 in the Second Kok cabinet he was made the Minister of Foreign Affairs. When the cabinet fell as a direct result of the NIOD Institute for War, Holocaust and Genocide Studies report about the fall of Srebrenica during the Bosnian War, he became parliamentary leader in the lower house of the States General.

On 1 April 2004 an attempt was made to run over Van Aartsen by a car when he and a co-worker were doing a photoshoot in front of Hotel Des Indes in The Hague. Van Aartsen was not hurt but the co-worker did sustain a shoulder injury. The assailant, a 41-year-old lawyer by the name of Frederiek de Jongh and an employee of Bureau Rechtshulp in Utrecht confessed her action was politically motivated.

Van Aartsen stepped down as VVD Leader in 2006; in a letter to the newly-elected party leader Mark Rutte, he however expressed his disappointment with the demise of the Second Balkenende cabinet which in his view was uncalled for. He also warned for VVD interparty warring between a populist fraction with a no-nonsense attitude and focus on tax cuts and law and order and a liberal fraction focused on personal freedoms, rule of law, international orientation and education. Jozias van Aartsen is a member of the Bilderberg Group.

He served as Mayor of The Hague from 2008 to 2017. He then took two acting positions: as King's Commissioner of the province of Drenthe and as Mayor of the capital Amsterdam.

Personal life
Van Aartsen retired from national politics but has remained active in the public sector and continues to occupy numerous seats as a nonprofit director on several boards of directors and supervisory boards and served on several state commissions and councils on behalf of the government.

Van Aartsen is known for his abilities as a manager and debater. His father Jan was also a politician who served as Minister of Transport and Water Management and Minister of Housing and Construction.

Decorations

References

External links

  J.J. (Jozias) van Aartsen Parlement & Politiek

 

 

1947 births
Living people
Dutch campaign managers
Dutch expatriates in Belgium
Dutch members of the Dutch Reformed Church
Dutch nonprofit directors
Dutch nonprofit executives
Dutch officials of the European Union
Dutch political consultants
Dutch speechwriters
Grand Officers of the Order of Orange-Nassau
Knights of the Order of the Netherlands Lion
Knights Grand Cross of the Order of Isabella the Catholic
King's and Queen's Commissioners of Drenthe
Mayors of Amsterdam
Mayors of The Hague
Members of the House of Representatives (Netherlands)
Ministers of Agriculture of the Netherlands
Ministers of Foreign Affairs of the Netherlands
Leaders of the People's Party for Freedom and Democracy
Politicians from The Hague
People's Party for Freedom and Democracy politicians
Protestant Church Christians from the Netherlands
Recipients of the Grand Cross of the Order of Leopold II
Vrije Universiteit Amsterdam alumni
20th-century Dutch civil servants
20th-century Dutch jurists
20th-century Dutch male writers
20th-century Dutch politicians
21st-century Dutch civil servants
21st-century Dutch jurists
21st-century Dutch politicians